The 1.25-meter, 220 MHz or 222 MHz band is a portion of the VHF radio spectrum internationally allocated for amateur radio use on a primary basis in ITU Region 2, and it comprises frequencies from 220 MHz to 225 MHz. In the United States and Canada, the band is available on a primary basis from 222 to 225 MHz, with the addition of 219 to 220 MHz on a limited, secondary basis. It is not available for use in ITU Region 1 (except in Somalia) or ITU Region 3. The license privileges of amateur radio operators include the use of frequencies within this band, which is primarily used for local communications.

History 

The 1.25-meter band has a very long and colorful history, dating back to before World War II.

Pre-Cairo Conference 
Some experimental amateur use in the U.S. was known to occur on the "-meter band" as early as 1933, with reliable communications achieved in fall of 1934.

The Cairo Conference 
In 1938, the FCC gave U.S. amateurs privileges in two VHF bands: 2.5 meters (112 MHz) and 1.25 meters (224 MHz). Both bands (as well as 70 centimeters) were natural harmonics of the 5-meter band. Amateur privileges in the 2.5-meter band were later moved to 144–148 MHz (becoming the modern-day 2-meter band), and the old frequencies were reassigned to aircraft communication during World War II. At that time, the 1.25-meter band expanded to a 5 MHz bandwidth, spanning 220–225 MHz.

The VHF/UHF explosion 
Amateur use of VHF and UHF allocations exploded in the late 1960s and early 1970s as repeaters started going on the air. Repeater use sparked a huge interest in the 2-meter and 70-centimeter (420–450 MHz) bands, however, this interest never fully found its way into the 1.25-meter band. Many amateurs attribute this to the abundance of commercial radio equipment designed for 136–174 MHz and 450–512 MHz that amateurs could easily modify for use on the 2-meter and 70-centimeter bands. There were no commercial frequency allocations near the 1.25-meter band, and little commercial radio equipment was available. This meant that amateurs who wanted to experiment with the 1.25-meter band had to build their own equipment or purchase one of the few radios available from specialized amateur radio equipment manufacturers. Many of the repeaters which have been constructed for 1.25-meter operation have been based on converted land-mobile base station hardware, often extensively modifying equipment originally designed for other VHF bands.

U.S. Novice licensees get privileges 
By the 1980s, amateur use of 2-meter and 70-centimeter bands was at an all-time high while activity on 1.25 meters remained stagnant. In an attempt to increase use on the band, many amateurs called for holders of Novice-class licenses (the entry-level class at that time) to be given voice privileges on the band. In 1987, the FCC modified the Novice license to allow voice privileges on portions of the 1.25-meter and 23-centimeter (1.24–1.30 GHz) bands. In response, some of the bigger amateur radio equipment manufacturers started producing equipment for 1.25 meters. However, it never sold well, and by the early 1990s, most manufacturers had stopped producing equipment for the band.

U.S. reallocation 
In 1973, the FCC considered Docket Number 19759, which was a proposal to establish a Class E Citizen's band service at 224 MHz. The proposal was opposed by the ARRL and after the explosive growth of 27 MHz Citizen's Band usage, the FCC dropped consideration of the docket in 1977.

In the late 1980s, United Parcel Service (UPS) began lobbying the FCC to reallocate part of the 1.25-meter band to the Land Mobile Service. UPS had publicized plans to use the band to develop a narrow-bandwidth wireless voice and data network using a mode called ACSSB (amplitude-companded single sideband). UPS's main argument for the reallocation was that amateur use of the band was very sparse and that the public interest would be better served by reallocating part of the band to a service that would put it to good use.

In 1988, over the objections of the amateur radio community, the FCC adopted the 220 MHz Allocation Order, which reallocated 220–222 MHz to private and federal government land-mobile use while leaving 222–225 MHz exclusively for amateur use. The reallocation proceeding took so long, however, that UPS eventually pursued other means of meeting its communications needs. UPS entered into agreements with GTE, McCall, Southwestern Bell, and Pac-Tel to use cellular telephone frequencies to build a wireless data network. With the 220–222 MHz band then left unused, the FCC issued parts of the band to other private commercial interests via a lottery in hopes that it would spark development of super-narrowband technologies, which would help them gain acceptance in the marketplace. In the 1990s and into the 2000s paging companies made use of the 1.25-meter band. Most all such use ended by the mid-2000s, with the paging companies being purchased by others and services moved to newer systems, or having gone out of business.

Canadian reallocation 
Until January 2006, Canadian amateur radio operators were allowed to operate within the entire 220–225 MHz band. Canadian operations within 120 km of the United States border were required to observe a number of restrictions on antenna height and power levels to coordinate use with non-amateur services in the United States.

In 2005, Industry Canada decided to reallocate 220–222 MHz to land mobile users, similar to the US, but unlike in the US, a provision was included to allow the amateur service, in exceptional circumstances, to use the band in disaster relief efforts on a secondary basis. In addition, the band 219–220 MHz was allocated to the amateur service on a secondary basis. Both of these reallocations went into effect January 2006.

Band use

Canadian band plan

Scope of operation in North America

Today, the 1.25-meter band is used by many amateurs who have an interest in the VHF spectrum.

There are pockets of widespread use across the United States, mainly in New England and western states such as California and Arizona with more sporadic activity elsewhere. The number of repeaters on the 1.25-meter band has grown over the years to approximately 1,500 nationwide as of 2004.

The attention that band received in the late 1980s and early 1990s due to the reallocation of its bottom 2 MHz sparked renewed amateur interest. Many amateurs feared that lack of 1.25-meter activity would lead to reallocation of the remaining 3 MHz to other services. Today, new handheld and mobile equipment is being produced by amateur radio manufacturers, and it is estimated that more amateurs have 1.25-meter equipment now than at any point in the past.

Auxiliary stations 
An auxiliary station, most often used for repeater control or link purposes or to remotely control another station, is limited in the United States to operation on frequencies above 144.5 MHz excluding 144.0–144.5 MHz, 145.8–146.0 MHz, 219–220 MHz, 222.00–222.15 MHz, 431–433 MHz, and 435–438 MHz. Operation of such control links in the crowded 2-meter band is problematic and on many frequencies in that band expressly prohibited, leaving 1.25-meter band frequencies as the lowest available for remote control of repeaters and unattended stations.

List of transceivers 

Since the band is allocated mostly in ITU Region 2 (Somalia, in Region 1, being the only exception thus far), the major equipment manufacturers (Kenwood, Yaesu, and Icom) do not often offer transceiver models that cover the frequency range. (see US Novice licensees get privileges). This exacerbates the lack of usage of the 1.25-meter band, though manufacturers argue that what equipment they have produced hasn't sold well compared to other products.

In recent years, Kenwood and Yaesu have both included the 1.25-meter band in some of their multiband handheld transceivers. The Kenwood TH-F6A and TH-D74A; the Yaesu VX-6R, VX-7R and VX-8R (USA and Canada version) include coverage of the 1.25-meter band in addition to the more popular 2-meter and 70-centimeter bands. Wouxun now has the KG-UVD1P in a 2-meter / 1.25-meter model, legal for use in the United States. In the 1980s, ICOM offered the IC-37A—a 220 MHz, 25-watt FM transceiver that can still be obtained as used equipment from various sources such as eBay and private collectors. In 2013, the BaoFeng UV-82X, an inexpensive 2-meter / 1.25-meter handheld, became available. During 2021, Baofeng then introduced its latest, and cheapest, UV-5r III handheld transceiver, which now includes the 1.25 meter band as standard.

Several 1.25-meter base/mobile transceivers are available. Among these are the Alinco DR-235T, the Jetstream JT220M, BTech UV-2501-220, BTech UV-25X4 quadband, and the TYT TH-9000 monoband radio, which comes in a 1.25-meter model.

The Chinese company Wouxun offers a 2 m and 1.25 m dual-band HT, the KG-UVD1P. These have received FCC approval in the United States; but are awaiting approval by Industry Canada.

Elecraft offers an all-mode (CW, FM, SSB) transverter for the band compatible with its K2 and K3 transceivers.

Countries with known allocations
ITU Region 1

Somalia (220–225 MHz)

ITU Region 2

Anguilla (220–225 MHz)
Argentina (220–225 MHz)
 Aruba (220–225 MHz)
 Barbados (222–225 MHz)
 Belize (220–225 MHz)
 Bermuda (220–225 MHz)
 Bolivia (220–225 MHz)
 Bonaire (220–225 MHz)
 Brazil (220–225 MHz)
 British Virgin Islands (220–225 MHz)
 Canada (222–225 MHz amateur primary exclusive; 219–220 MHz secondary and shared; 220–222 MHz, only for "disaster relief" )
 Cayman Islands (220–225 MHz)
 Chile (220–225 MHz)
 Costa Rica (222–225 MHz)
 Colombia (220–225 MHz)
 Cuba (222.9–224.6 MHz)
 Curaçao (220–225 MHz)
 Dominica (222.340–224.000 MHz)
 Dominican Republic (220–225 MHz)
 Ecuador (220–225 MHz)
 El Salvador (220–225 MHz)
French Overseas Departments and Territories in Region 2 (220–225 MHz)
Overseas Departments:
French Guiana
Guadeloupe
Martinique
Overseas collectivities:
Saint Barthélemy
Saint Martin
Saint Pierre and Miquelon

 Haiti (220–225 MHz)
 Honduras (222–225 MHz)
 Jamaica (220–225 MHz)
 Mexico (222–225 MHz) (Band is channelized in some segments, and shared with commercial and government operations, including police.)
 Montserrat (220–225 MHz)
 Nicaragua (220–225 MHz)
 Panama (220–225 MHz)
 Paraguay (220–225 MHz)
 Peru (220–222 MHz)
 Sint Maarten (220–225 MHz)
 Suriname (220–225 MHz)
 Trinidad and Tobago (220–225 MHz)
 Turks and Caicos Islands (222–225 MHz)
United States of America (222–225 MHz amateur primary exclusive; 219–220 MHz secondary, shared and limited)
 Uruguay (220–225 MHz)
 Venezuela (220–225 MHz)

References 

Amateur radio bands